Kenya competed at the 2015 World Aquatics Championships in Kazan, Russia from 24 July to 9 August 2015.

Swimming

Kenyan swimmers have achieved qualifying standards in the following events (up to a maximum of 2 swimmers in each event at the A-standard entry time, and 1 at the B-standard):

Men

Women

Mixed

References

External links
Kenya Swimming Federation

Nations at the 2015 World Aquatics Championships
2015
World Aquatics Championships